The following is a list of recurring Saturday Night Live characters and sketches introduced between September 29, 2007, and May 17, 2008, the thirty-third season of SNL.

Nicholas Fehn
Claiming to be a political comedian, Nicholas Fehn (Fred Armisen) takes the top headlines from newspapers and offers his own "skewed view" of them. However, he never actually manages to say anything satirical or clever,  often simply shouting "C'mon!" or "No!" and sometimes "Who asked?!"  When confronted with his lack of humorous material, he will try to defend himself, but will get only about a dozen or so words into each thought when he will go off on a tangent, resulting in his argument going nowhere. On a live episode of WTF with Marc Maron, Armisen revealed that Fehn was partially inspired by Maron, David Cross, and himself.

Appearances

Jean K. Jean
Jean K. Jean, portrayed by Kenan Thompson, is a black comedian signed by Def Jam France, who speaks perfect English and whose act consists of Americanized urban quips and zings. The punchline of these zings incorporate French words or references. Once accomplishing the zing, he shouts "Zut Alors!", stands up, and grooves to a hip-hop beat, waits three seconds and gives the cut-off hand signal (swift hand movement across the neck). The music stops sharply on his cue, he sits back down, and shouts "Incroyable!" His attire consists of various outfits, but the only stereotypical French items appearing in all of his appearances is a beret and a scarf. Jean K. Jean is occasionally introduced as being from Paris but according to one segment he claims to be from Marseille.

Appearances

The Suze Orman Show
A parody of the financial advice program The Suze Orman Show, starring Kristen Wiig as Suze Orman.

Appearances

Wiig also appeared as Orman on the October 1, 2009, episode of Weekend Update Thursday.

Adam Grossman
Jonah Hill plays a precocious six-year-old comedian who performs Borscht Belt humor while visiting a hibachi restaurant with his divorced father, Evan (Bill Hader).

Appearances

Clancy and Jackie
Clancy T. Bachleratt (Will Forte) and Jackie Snad (Kristen Wiig) sing tunes from their album of songs about spaceships, toddlers, Model T cars, and jars of beer.

Appearances

Sue
Kristen Wiig plays Sue, who loves surprises but has trouble keeping them secret.

Appearances

Family Reunion
A celebrity (the host playing himself) attends an extended-family reunion where everyone is a caricature of his personality and/or characters over the years.

Appearances

A "Franco Family Reunion" was mentioned during the December 9, 2017 episode hosted by James Franco.

The Cougar Den
Deidre Nicks (Amy Poehler), Toni Ward (Casey Wilson), and Jacqueline Seka (Kristen Wiig) host a talk show for "cougars", older women who date younger men. Other characters in this sketch include Kenneth (Kenan Thompson) the stage director and Kiki Deamore (Cameron Diaz), the show's most frequent guest.

Appearances

This sketch also appeared in the dress rehearsal for the November 14, 2009, episode hosted by January Jones, but was cut for the live episode.

Judy Grimes
Judy Grimes is Weekend Update's Travel Expert, played by Kristen Wiig. Grimes suffers from extreme stage fright, causing her to appear visibly nervous and talk in long, fast-paced sentences; she often uses the phrase "just kidding" to punctuate her run-on sentences. In her first appearance she talked in small portions and laughed nervously throughout them, but now it has shifted into very long parts.

Appearances

Scared Straight
As part of the Scared Straight program, Officer Sikorsky (Jason Sudeikis) invites two imprisoned convicts, Lorenzo MacIntosh (Kenan Thompson) and another played by the episode's host, to speak to three young hoodlums (Bill Hader, Bobby Moynihan and Andy Samberg) about the horrors of prison life. However, each story the convicts tell is easily recognized by the kids as the plotline from a feature film. As they identify each movie, the convicts turn the film into a reference to prison rape (for example, following The Wizard of Oz: "It won't be a lion, a tin man and a scarecrow. It'll be you, lying down, while ten men make you a scared ho!").

Appearances

This sketch was included in the dress rehearsal for the October 8, 2011, episode (hosted by Ben Stiller), but was cut for the final broadcast.

References

Lists of recurring Saturday Night Live characters and sketches
Saturday Night Live in the 2000s
Saturday Night Live
Saturday Night Live